The 1911 Brighton by-election was held on 26 June 1911.  The by-election was held due to the succession of the incumbent Conservative MP, Walter Rice as seventh Baron Dynevor.  It was won by the Conservative candidate John Gordon, who was unopposed.

References

1911 elections in the United Kingdom
1911 in England
20th century in Sussex
By-elections to the Parliament of the United Kingdom in East Sussex constituencies
Unopposed by-elections to the Parliament of the United Kingdom (need citation)
Politics of Brighton and Hove
June 1911 events